West Ham is a constituency created in 1997 and represented in the House of Commons of the UK Parliament since 2005 by Lyn Brown, a member of the Labour Party.

Boundaries 

1997–2010: The London Borough of Newham wards of Bemersyde, Forest Gate, Hudsons, New Town, Park, Plaistow, Plashet, Stratford, Upton, and West Ham.

2010–present: The London Borough of Newham wards of Canning Town North, Canning Town South, Custom House, Forest Gate North, Forest Gate South, Green Street West, Plaistow North, Plaistow South, Stratford and New Town, and West Ham.

The constituency covers the western half of Newham stretching from the Thames just east of Canary Wharf to Stratford. The boundary changes that took effect for the 2010 general election expanded the constituency by adding Canning Town from the abolished Poplar and Canning Town constituency, whilst losing Silvertown to the redrawn East Ham. The boundary with the East Ham constituency was modified to align with local government ward boundaries.

History
The seat was created in 1997 by the fourth periodic review (following the first such review in 1945), undertaken by the Boundary Commission, from portions of the Newham North West and Newham South seats.

The area's elections to date, including both forerunner seats have returned safe majorities for the Labour Party since the last Conservative for the smaller, denser divisions from 1931 to 1934; going back further, West Ham South had in 1892 sent Keir Hardie to the Commons who co-founded the party.

The first member, Tony Banks, served the main predecessor seat, Newham North West from 1983 and was Minister for Sport (1997-1999). He held this seat at the 2001 general election with nearly 70% of the vote and a local record majority of 53.5% of the vote. He retired from the House of Commons at the 2005 general election.

The 2010 result, not only on the notional result, accommodating boundary changes, but also on predecessor-successor seat analysis shows that the main beneficiary of the runner-up Respect vote, as they did not have a candidate in that year, was the Labour candidate.  The 2015 result made the seat the 14th safest of Labour's 232 seats by percentage of majority.

Constituency profile
Helped by proximity to the City of London and exporting businesses in areas such as Hackney, Shoreditch and the Thames Gateway, the area is only gradually recovering in terms of employment rates from the deep East End decline, particularly decline of the dockers' industry here of the 1950s to the 1980s, with an immediate boost from the 2010 creation of the London Olympic Village and Park. In November 2012, workless claimants who were registered jobseekers were significantly higher than the national average of 3.8%, at 7.7% of the population based on a statistical compilation by The Guardian, though not the highest in London.  Within this figure is a skew toward male unemployment which was at 9.8%

Now that the Olympic stadium has become West Ham United's home the club is located in the constituency that shares its name; their previous ground at Upton Park was actually in the neighbouring East Ham seat.

Demographics
In the 1991 census just over 43% of residents were non-white. By the time of the 2001 census, people who identified as white made up 44.1% of the population and 35.3% of residents were born outside the UK, and in the 2011 census the borough saw an increase in those of mixed colour ethnicity at 4.6%, and saw the lowest proportion of people of solely white ethnicity at 29.0%, the figure for those of black ethnicity had fallen to 19.6%, and those of South Asian ethnicity had risen to 43.5% of the population.

In terms of religion the British Asian population is more than 50% Muslim in this constituency. By the time of the 2005 general election, only seven of the 646 constituencies had more Muslims than West Ham. Respect fielded a candidate for the 2005 election, hoping to benefit from opposition to the Iraq war; in the end this was not enough to unseat Labour's replacement for Banks, Lyn Brown, but Respect managed to take nearly 20% of the vote.

Members of Parliament

Election results

Elections in the 2010s 

The Green Party originally selected Jane Lithgow as their candidate for the 2010 election.

Elections in the 2000s

Elections in the 1990s

See also 
 List of parliamentary constituencies in London

Notes

References

External links 
Politics Resources (Election results from 1922 onwards)
Electoral Calculus (Election results from 1955 onwards)
 BBC Election 2005: West Ham

Parliamentary constituencies in London
Politics of the London Borough of Newham
Constituencies of the Parliament of the United Kingdom established in 1997
West Ham